Cathouse may refer to:

 Brothel

Arts, media, and entertainment
Cathouse: The Series, a TV documentary series
 Cathouse: A Man-Kzin Novel, a novel by Dean Ing set in the Man-Kzin Wars series
 Cathouse, a novella by Dean Ing contained in the Cathouse novel, the Houses of the Kzinti novel and The Man-Kzin Wars novel
 "Cathouse", a song by Faster Pussycat from Faster Pussycat

Business
 Glasgow Cathouse, a nightclub in Glasgow
 "Cathouse", restaurant in the Luxor Las Vegas

See also
Cat House (disambiguation)